John Kilpatrick (born 20 November 1938) is a former  Australian rules footballer who played with St Kilda in the Victorian Football League (VFL).

Notes 

Team Trainer for the VFL Hawthorne Hawks and pictured in the famous 1989 season decider between Hawthorn and Geelong with Dermott Brereton.

External links 

Living people
1938 births
Australian rules footballers from Victoria (Australia)
St Kilda Football Club players